Samuel Adu Frimpong (born 4 April 1994), popularly known as Medikal, is a Ghanaian hip hop musician born to Portia Lamptey and James Frimpong in Sowutuom, a suburb of Accra.

Early life and music career 
He comes from Sowutuom, a suburb in Accra, Ghana. Medikal and Sarkodie had the highest nominations for the 2017 edition of the Ghana Music Awards. In 2018, he was on the Tim Westwood Show. Medikal had his high school education at Odorgonno Senior High. He is the son of James Frimpong and Portia Lamptey. Samuel adopted the name Medikal because he was fascinated with rapping about doctors, surgeons, medical practitioners and hospitals in general. He has made a name for himself in the music industry through hard work and numerous collaboration with successful artists. Apart from his nominations in 2017, he won the best discovery video in the MTN 4Syte Video Award in 2016.

Albums and EPs 
Medikation (2013)
 Disturbation (2017)
The Plug EP(2019)
Island (2020)
The Truth (2020)

Awards and nominations

3Music Awards 
In March 2021, he won the Hiplife/Hiphop Act of the Year in the 3Music Awards.

In June 2021, he won the Hiplife/Hiphop Artist of the Year at the Vodafone Ghana Music Awards22

Personal life 
Rapper Medikal is married to entrepreneur and movie star Fella Makafui with one child.

Controversy 
In October 2021, he was arrested for brandishing a gun on social media. He was later charged for unlawful display of arms and ammunition and he pleaded not guilty. He was then remanded to prison custody for 5 days by an Accra Circuit court. At the hearing on Tuesday, October 26, after five days on remand, he was granted bail to the tune of GH¢100,000 with one surety.

References 

Living people
Ghanaian rappers
1991 births
Ghanaian musicians